Seema also spelled Sima, Sema is an Indian feminine given name meaning 'limit/boundary/frontier'. 

Notable people with the name include:
Seema (actress) (born 1957), Indian film actress
Seema Azmi, Indian cinema and theatre actress
Seema Bisla (born 1993), Indian freestyle wrestler
Seema Biswas (born 1965), Indian film and theatre actress
Seema Bowri (born 1976), British-based actor
Seema Desai (born 1981), Indian cricketer
Seema Jaswal (born 1985), British presenter
Seema Kennedy (born 1976), British Conservative Party Member of Parliament
Seema Malhotra (born 1972), British Labour Party Member of Parliament
Seema Mustafa (born 1955), Indian journalist
Seema Pahwa, Indian soap opera actress
Seema Parihar (born 1976), former bandit and member of the Samajwadi Party
Seema Pujare (born 1976), Indian cricketer
Seema Punia (born 1983), also known as Seema Antil, Indian discus thrower
Seema Upadhyay (born 1965), Indian politician, belonging to Bahujan Samaj Party
Seema Verma (born 1970), American health policy consultant and former administrator

References 

Given names
Indian given names
Indian feminine given names
Hindu given names